Sir Francis Clare Ford  (4 June 1828 – 31 January 1899) was an English diplomat from London.

Ford was born at was born at 32 Upper Brook Street, the son of writer Richard Ford and his wife, Harriet. He was commissioned a lieutenant in the 4th Light Dragoons. However, he left the army in 1851, entered the diplomatic service, and became Secretary of Legation at Washington, D.C., where he was acting chargé d'affaires in 1867–1868. In 1871 he was appointed Secretary of Embassy at St Petersburg and in 1872 was transferred to Vienna. He represented the British government in 1875–77 at Halifax before the Halifax Fisheries Commission, by decision of which $5,500,000 was awarded to Great Britain for superior advantages obtained by the United States in the Washington fisheries treaty of 1871. In 1878–1879 he was Minister to the Argentine Republic and during a portion of the time to Uruguay also.

Ford was afterward appointed to similar posts at Rio de Janeiro and at Athens. In 1884 he became Minister (from 1887 Ambassador) to Spain; while there he acted as British commissioner in Paris in 1884 and 1885 to settle the Newfoundland fisheries question. In 1892 he was transferred to Constantinople and in 1893 to Rome. His services to British diplomacy won for him frequent official recognition, including appointment to the Privy Council in 1888.

Dead in Paris, he is buried in Cimetière de l'Ouest (Boulogne-Billancourt).

References

FORD, Rt Hon. Sir (Francis) Clare, Who Was Who, A & C Black, 1920–2008; online edn, Oxford University Press, Dec 2007, accessed 20 June 2012
Sir Francis Clare Ford, G.C.B., G.C.M.G. (obituary), The Times, London, 1 February 1899, page 6

External links 

 Album of views and customs of the province of Buenos Aires,1844-1878, Getty Research Institute, Los Angeles. Accession No. 2016.R.39. The album contains 77 photographs and 20 pencil tracings, compiled by the British diplomat Francis Clare Ford during his first posting to Buenos Aires in 1866.

Knights Grand Cross of the Order of the Bath
Knights Grand Cross of the Order of St Michael and St George
Members of the Privy Council of the United Kingdom
People from Mayfair
1828 births
1899 deaths
Ambassadors of the United Kingdom of Great Britain and Ireland to Spain
Ambassadors of the United Kingdom to Brazil
Ambassadors of the United Kingdom to the Ottoman Empire
Ambassadors of the United Kingdom to Argentina
Ambassadors of the United Kingdom to Uruguay
Ambassadors of the United Kingdom to Italy